David See-chai Lam,  (July 25, 1923November 22, 2010) was a Hong Kong-born Canadian banker, businessman, investor, philanthropist, and politician. From 1988 to 1995, Lam was the 25th Lieutenant Governor of British Columbia, and he was the first Chinese Canadian to be appointed as a vice-regal in Canada. He was known for his charitable efforts, donating millions of dollars and leveraging millions more to support educational institutions and activities in Hong Kong, Canada, and the United States.

Early life 
David See-chai Lam was born in Hong Kong on July 25, 1923; he was the second oldest of nine children of Lam Chi Fung, a Hong Kong coal importer and distributor, and Chan Chik-Ting Lam. When Lam turned 18, his plans to attend university were sidelined by World War II. During the war, he worked in the administration of the family’s coal business, and his life was often at risk. Among the close calls, Lam was bombed at a dock, chased by pirates, and opted not to board a ship that was later torpedoed. Understanding the danger, Chi Fung decided it was time for Lam to undertake his university studies.

In 1947, Lam earned a degree in economics from Lingnan University in Hong Kong. He developed fluency in five languages, and earned an MBA degree from Temple University in the United States. He returned to Hong Kong in 1949 and began a successful career in his family's banking business at Ka Wah Bank. While dancing at a ball, Lam met his future wife, Dorothy. They dated for two years, and married in the fall of 1954. Together they had three daughters: Deborah, Daphne, and Doreen. After working as a banker for 18 years, Lam and his family immigrated to Vancouver in 1967.

Career 
Lam became a prominent real estate entrepreneur in Vancouver, and was a leading proponent of many groundbreaking real estate development ventures.  He is also noted for being a leading philanthropist.  He founded the Floribunda Philanthropic Society, and the David &  Dorothy Lam Foundation.  He donated substantial funds to cultural projects in his adopted province and country.  He served as Chairman of Hong Kong Baptist College, trustee of the Chancellor's Circle at the University of British Columbia, which later awarded him an honorary degree, and was a benefactor to the David C. Lam Institute for East-West Studies at Hong Kong Baptist University.  In 1986, he helped found the Canadian International Dragon Boat Festival.

Lieutenant Governor 
In 1988 Governor General Jeanne Sauvé, on the advice of Prime Minister Brian Mulroney, appointed him lieutenant governor. Lam represented the Crown during the term of three Premiers: William Vander Zalm, Rita Johnston, and Michael Harcourt.

He formally ended the practice of lieutenant governors wearing the Windsor uniform. This practice was reinstated by Lieutenant Governor Steven Point.

Lam was Canada's second non-white lieutenant governor (the first being Lincoln Alexander of Ontario) and was the first Asian Canadian as well as the first Chinese Canadian lieutenant governor.

Honours 
In 1988, he was made a Knight Commander of the Order of St. John (KStJ) and Vice-Prior of the Order from 1988 to 1995.
In 1988, he was made a Member of the Order of Canada and was promoted to Officer in 1995. 
In 1994, he was made a Commander of the Royal Victorian Order (CVO) by the Queen in 1994.
In 1995, he was awarded the Order of British Columbia.
In 1995, David Lam Park in Vancouver, BC was named after him.

Death
Lam died on November 22, 2010 from prostate cancer at the age of 87. He was predeceased by his wife of 43 years, Dorothy, who died in 1997, while survived by three children and seven grandchildren.

Arms

References

External links 
Order of Canada Citation
Biography from the website of the Lieutenant-Governor of British Columbia

1923 births
2010 deaths
20th-century Baptists
20th-century philanthropists
Alumni of Lingnan University (Hong Kong)
Businesspeople from Vancouver
Canadian Baptists
Canadian Commanders of the Royal Victorian Order
Canadian investors
Canadian philanthropists
Canadian politicians of Hong Kong descent
Canadian real estate businesspeople
Deaths from prostate cancer
Hong Kong emigrants to Canada
Lieutenant Governors of British Columbia
Members of the Order of British Columbia
Naturalized citizens of Canada
Officers of the Order of Canada
Reform Club of Hong Kong politicians
Temple University alumni